The sixth Minnesota Territorial Legislature first convened on January 3, 1855. The 9 members of the Minnesota Territorial Council were elected during the General Election of October 12, 1853, and the 18 members of the Minnesota House of Representatives were elected during the General Election of October 10, 1854.

Sessions 
The territorial legislature met in a regular session from January 3, 1855 to March 3, 1855. There were no special sessions of the sixth territorial legislature.

Party summary

Council

House of Representatives

Leadership 
President of the Council
Until February 16 Samuel Baldwin Olmstead (D-Belle Prairie)
Since February 16 William Pitt Murray (D-Saint Paul)

Speaker of the House
James S. Norris (D-Cottage Grove)

Members

Council

House of Representatives

Notes

References 

 Minnesota Legislators Past & Present - Session Search Results (Session 0.6, Senate)
 Minnesota Legislators Past & Present - Session Search Results (Session 0.6, House)

00.6th
1850s in Minnesota Territory